The Epidemic Response Committee was a select committee of the New Zealand House of Representatives. It was established on 25 March 2020 during the 52nd Parliament in response to the coronavirus pandemic. Its purpose was to hold the government to account with regards to its response to the coronavirus pandemic, as the rest of Parliament was shut down to contain the pandemic. The committee was chaired by Simon Bridges, the then Leader of the Opposition. Michael Woodhouse, the Opposition Health spokesperson, was designated as deputy chair on 5 May 2020. On 26 May 2020 the committee was disbanded by a motion passed by the 52nd Parliament with leader of the House Chris Hipkins stating the committee was no longer needed as New Zealand had moved to COVID-19 alert level 2, and parliament could function largely as it did pre lockdown.

The committee had eleven members. Permanent members of the committee were Bridges as chairperson and David Seymour as the sole member of ACT New Zealand. Other members are made up from the various parties represented in parliament; four National Party members in addition to Bridges, three members from the Labour Party, and one member each from the Green Party and New Zealand First. The committee met via Zoom.

The membership of the committee was as follows:

Key

References

National responses to the COVID-19 pandemic
COVID-19 pandemic in New Zealand
Parliament of New Zealand